Spain and its OTI member station RTVE (Spanish Radio and Television) was one of the founding members of the OTI Festival and debuted in the event in 1972 in Madrid, being the host broadcaster of the first show. The Spanish participation in the song contest was almost uninterrupted, in fact, RTVE only withdrew from the contest in the edition of 1986, which was held in Santiago, as a protest against the Augusto Pinochet dictatorship.

History 
Although RTVE selected their representants internally and didn't follow the tradition of national finals started by countries such as Mexico, Chile or Guatemala, Spain almost always selected famous names, most of whom would achieve strong results. Spain won the event on 6 occasions, which makes it the second most successful participant after Mexico.

The first Spanish victory came in 1976 with the singer-songwriter María Ostiz and her song "Canta cigarra" (Cicada, start singing!). This protest song, which transmitted a deep feeling of sadness, was not one of the favourite ones to win the contest, in fact being among the least favoured entries in the betting odds. Ostiz, who thought that she could not win, left the auditorium before the voting process started, but she had to return when her victory was clear.

In 1981, RTVE achieved the second Spanish victory in the festival, which was held in Mexico City, with Francisco and his song "Latino" (Latin man). This song became a great hit both in Spain and Latin America and contributed to launch the career of the singer internationally. Francisco won again the festival in 1992 with the song "¿Adonde voy sin ti?" (Where am I going without you?). Since then, the singer started became known as the Latin Johnny Logan because of his two victories.

One year later, the Flamenco singer Ana Reverte achieved the fourth Spanish victory in the festival with the song "Enamorarse" (To fall in love).

The last Spanish victories came with Marcos Llunas in 1995 (who would represent Spain in the Eurovision Song Contest two years later) and with Anabel Russ in 1996.

Spain in OTI vs Spain in Eurovision 
Many of the Spanish entrants in the OTI Festival later represented Spain in the Eurovision Song Contest. This is the case of the band Trigo Limpio which took part in the Latin American song contest before they competed in Eurovision in 1980. In 1984, Amaya Saizar, who was the first vocalist of Trigo Limpio and the one who appeared in the OTI Festival, competed in Eurovision as member of the band Bravo.

After that, Marcos Llunas won the OTI Festival before placing 6th at Eurovision in 1997.

Other artists such as the band Alex y Cristina tried to represent Spain in the Eurovision Song Contest in 1986, but two years after being rejected, they participated in the OTI Festival in 1988 achieving 10th place.

In general, from the 1970s till the late 1990s, the Spanish Eurovision fans always claimed that RTVE seemed to be much more interested in the OTI Festival than in the Eurovision Song Contest. The followers of the European song contest complained that the Spanish broadcaster almost always selected famous names for the OTI Song Contest, while the Spanish performers in Eurovision were unknown to much of the audience.

Contestants 

Table key

See also
Spain in the Eurovision Song Contest
Spain in the Junior Eurovision Song Contest

References 

OTI Festival